Bo Bia is a village and tambon (sub-district) of Ban Khok District, in Uttaradit Province, Thailand. In 2005 it had a population of 3,482 people. The tambon contains seven villages.

References

Tambon of Uttaradit province
Populated places in Uttaradit province